Hyderabad House is an official residence in New Delhi, India. It is the State Guest House of the Prime Minister of India. It is used by the Government of India for banquets, and as a venue for meetings with visiting foreign dignitaries. It was designed by British architect Edwin Lutyens as a residence for Mir Osman Ali Khan, the last Nizam of Hyderabad.

History
Hyderabad House was built for Mir Osman Ali Khan, the last Nizam of Hyderabad. It is situated next to the Baroda House, the erstwhile royal residence of the Maharaja of Baroda and currently the zonal headquarters office of Northern Railways.

After Indian independence in 1947, the palace was taken over by the Indian Government from the Nizam. It is currently used by the Government of India for banquets and meetings for visiting foreign dignitaries. It has also been a venue for joint press conferences and major government events.

Architecture 
Spread over 8.77 acres, and built in the shape of a butterfly, in Indo-Saracenic architecture. The entrance hall of the palace, a dome with an entrance hall beneath with symmetrical wings at fifty-five degree angle, is the outstanding feature. It has 36 rooms including a zenana, four of which have now been converted into dining rooms. It is located to the northwest of the India Gate. 

With the exception of the Viceroy's House, it was the largest and grandest of all palaces built in Delhi by Edwin Lutyens during 1921-1931. The Nizam’s sons disliked the building, finding it too western in style for their taste and was seldom used.

See also 
 List of official residences of India
 Jodhpur House
 Jaipur House
 Bikaner House
 Baroda House
 Patiala House
 Dholpur House

References

Further reading
 
 Delhi By Patrick Horton, Hugh Finlay

External links

Deccan Herald feature
Panoramio photo

Official residences in India
Hyderabad State
Government buildings in Delhi
Royal residences in Delhi
Works of Edwin Lutyens in India
Palaces of Nizams of Hyderabad
State guesthouses